Russian Rugby League Federation was the governing body for rugby league in Russia until 2010. It was founded in 1978 mainly as a governing body for Moscow-based teams, and became the head body for all of Russia in 1986. The Russian Rugby League Federation became affiliated to the Rugby League International Federation in 1993. In 2003 the Russia became a full test nation in rugby league.

Russian Ministry of Sports order number 21 dated 20 January 2010, expelled Rugby League from the State Register of Sports of Russia.
President Alexander Eremin, board member and employees will discuss the option for the continuation of Rugby League in Russia with various government, civic and sports organizations, in particular the ministry of Sports and Rugby Union of Russia

After the 2022 Russian invasion of Ukraine, the International Rugby League and European Rugby League banned Russia from all international rugby league competitions.

See also

Russia national rugby league team
Rugby league in Russia
Russian Championship

References

External links

Rugby league in Russia
Rugby league governing bodies in Europe
Rugby League
Sports organizations established in 1978